In linguistics, Middle German may refer to:

 Middle High German, dialects of the 11th–15th centuries, evolved from Old High German
 Middle Low German, dialects of the 11th–15th centuries, evolved from Old Saxon (Old Low German)
 Central German, the general term for High German dialects in Central Germany

See also 
 Central Germany (geography)
 Central Germany (cultural area)